Hussain Shareef (born 5 September 1998), is a Maldivian footballer who plays as a goalkeeper for Dhivehi Premier League club, Maziya and the Maldives national team.

Club career
Hussain Shareef joined Maziya Academy in 2015, breaking through to the first team for the 2016 season.

Upon the departure of Maziya goalkeeper Mauro Boerchio, Shareef made his club debut on 28 May 2018, in the 2018 Malé League against United Victory, keeping a chean sheet in the 2-0 win.

On 11 March 2020, Shareef made his AFC Cup debut against Chennai City at the Jawaharlal Nehru Stadium in the 2–2 draw, as their first choice Ovays Azizi was suspended after being cautioned in both legs of the 2020 AFC Cup play-offs against Bengaluru.

In the 2020–21 season, Shareef kept 4 clean sheets in 5 Dhivehi Premier League games, conceding only one goal.

International career
Shareef was first called up to the Maldives national team in November 2017, for the 2019 AFC Asian Cup qualification third round game against Palestine. He was also included in the coach Petar Segrt's final 20-men for the 2018 SAFF Championship but was an unused substitute throughout the tournament, in which the Maldives were the eventual winners.

He made his senior international debut on 3 November 2018, in a 3–0 defeat against Malaysia.

After making his debut for the senior national team, Shareef was selected in the Maldives under-23 national team for the 2020 AFC U-23 Championship qualification in Saudi Arabia.

Personal life
Hussain Shareef married his girlfriend Aishath Layaal on 20 December 2020.

Career statistics

Club

International

Honours

Club
Maziya
 FA Charity Shield: 2016, 2017
 Malé League: 2017
 Dhivehi Premier League: 2016, 2019–20, 2020–21

International
Maldives 
 SAFF Championship: 2018

References

External links
 

1998 births
Living people
Maldivian footballers
Association football goalkeepers
Maldives international footballers
Maziya S&RC players